Elections to Cambridge City Council were held on 6 May 2010 as part of the wider local elections across England.

Results summary

Ward results

Abbey

Arbury

Castle

Cherry Hinton

Coleridge

East Chesterton

King's Hedges

Market

Newnham

Petersfield

Queen's Edith

Romsey

Trumpington

West Chesterton

By-elections

Coleridge

A by-election was called due to the resignation of incumbent Conservative councillor Chris Howell.

References

2010
2010 English local elections